Oleh Yuriyovych Holodyuk (born 2 January 1988) is a Ukrainian professional football midfielder.

Career
He is the product of the Karpaty Lviv Youth School System. He played for Ukrainian Premier League club FC Karpaty Lviv.

External links
 
 
 Website Karpaty Profile
 Profile on Football Squads

1988 births
Living people
People from Varash
Ukrainian footballers
Ukraine youth international footballers
Ukraine under-21 international footballers
Ukrainian expatriate footballers
Ukrainian Premier League players
Ukrainian First League players
Ukrainian Second League players
FC Karpaty Lviv players
FC Karpaty-2 Lviv players
FC Vorskla Poltava players
Association football midfielders
Expatriate footballers in Hungary
Ukrainian expatriate sportspeople in Hungary
Szombathelyi Haladás footballers
Zalaegerszegi TE players
Nemzeti Bajnokság I players
FC Mynai players
FC Metalist 1925 Kharkiv players
Sportspeople from Rivne Oblast